Intuit Dome is an indoor arena under construction in Inglewood, California. Located south of SoFi Stadium, it will be the future home of the Los Angeles Clippers of the NBA (NBA), moving from the Crypto.com Arena.

After the Clippers were required to acquire another Inglewood venue, The Forum (the Lakers' former home arena), to settle a legal dispute with The Madison Square Garden Company that sought to block its construction, a groundbreaking ceremony for the new arena was held on September 17, 2021, with construction expected to be completed in 2024.

History

Negotiations, Clippers previous arena history 
In 2017, the city of Inglewood approved an exclusive negotiating agreement with the Los Angeles Clippers to build a new, basketball-specific arena for the team, which would be located across from the then-under construction SoFi Stadium. The Clippers had not had their own arena since they left the Los Angeles Memorial Sports Arena for Staples Center (now Crypto.com Arena), which they share with the Los Angeles Lakers and the NHL's Kings. 

Throughout the team's history, it never had any tangible ownership interest in any of its home arenas. The Clippers instead rented its previous venues in Buffalo's Memorial Auditorium as the Braves, where it held low priority beneath the Sabres and Canisius college basketball, then San Diego's Sports Arena when they became the Clippers, followed by the L.A. Sports Arena. 

Its current deal with Crypto.com Arena, which besides allowing for a different Clipper court, requires a 'neutralization' process before and after each game to cover up Laker achievements, banners and sponsorships, along with its own court lighting pattern, and in tightly-scheduled weekends with both the Kings and/or musical concerts in addition to the Lakers, often requires that process to occur within a three to four hour window (along with cleanup of the seating bowl from the previous event).  Clippers owner Steve Ballmer saw the construction of a dedicated arena for the team as being a high priority.

Lawsuits 
Various lawsuits were filed to prevent the construction of the arena. Uplift Inglewood filed a lawsuit alleging that the agreement between the Clippers and Inglewood violated the state Surplus Land Act, which requires that proposals for affordable housing, recreation, and school projects be given preference when a city intends to sell its public land. Mayor James T. Butts Jr. argued that the proposed site had already been deemed unsuitable for residential use due to its proximity to Los Angeles International Airport.

The Madison Square Garden Company—owner of The Forum, a nearby arena in Inglewood that formerly served as the Lakers' home arena—were accused of using litigation to block the new arena, fearing that it would unduly compete with The Forum's live events business. MSG paid the legal fees of Inglewood Residents Against Takings and Evictions (IRATE), another group that filed lawsuits opposing the arena. In December 2018, the Clippers (via its subsidiary Murphy's Bowl, LLC) filed a countersuit against MSG over the matter.

In March 2019, leaked emails revealed that Irving Azoff attempted to lure the Los Angeles Lakers back to The Forum after their lease of Staples Center was up. Despite nothing coming of the proposal, Azoff's proposal to re-purpose The Forum was seen as a way of preventing the LA Clippers from building their own arena in Inglewood and ensuring that the Madison Square Garden Company got an unfair advantage over rival AEG, which is a Lakers minority owner. In November 2019, a judge ruled against Uplift Inglewood's lawsuit. In December 2019, the California Air Resources Board (CARB) approved the new arena, after evaluating the arena's environmental impact.

Construction 
In March 2020, in a move to settle the litigation with MSG, Ballmer announced that he would acquire The Forum for $400 million in an all-cash deal. The sale was completed in May, with all existing employees retained under the new ownership. The acquisition of The Forum was considered to be the last major hurdle blocking the construction of the new arena.

A groundbreaking ceremony was held on September 17, 2021. Ballmer described a goal for the new arena to be a "basketball palazzo". A 23-year naming rights deal was announced with financial software company Intuit, naming the arena Intuit Dome. The arena is expected to be completed in 2024.

Features
On July 25, 2019, the Clippers released renderings of the proposed arena. The 18,000-seat arena will be designed by AECOM. It will include a practice facility, sports medicine clinic, team offices, retail space and a large outdoor plaza with basketball courts that will be open to the public.

The practice facility will be , the team offices  and the sports medicine clinic .

References

External links
 Intuit Dome Website

Indoor arenas under construction in the United States
Intuit
Basketball venues in California
Los Angeles Clippers
National Basketball Association venues
Sports venues in Inglewood, California